The Lost in the Fog Stakes is an American ungraded stakes run at Golden Gate Fields in Albany, California for Thoroughbred two-year-old horses.  A five-furlong sprint, the race is named in honor of Lost in the Fog, the brilliant sprinter who made his name between 2004 and 2006 before dying of lymphoma at age four.

First run on June 10, 2007, the Lost in the Fog currently offers a purse of $50,000 (includes $15,000 CBOIF: California Bred Owner Fund) and is a proving ground for young sprinters.

Past winners

 2016 - Outside Nashville (1:08.40) (Ricardo Gonzalez)
 2015 - Marino's Wild Cat (1:08.92) (Silvio Ruiz Amador)
 2014 - Zeewat (Russell Baze)
 2013 - Skydreamin (1:00.64) (Russell Baze)
 2012 - Anytime Magic (0:59.59)
 2011 - City Route (Kevin Krigger; time 57.75 seconds) (filly)
 2010 - Road Ready (Russell Baze; 59.48)
 2009 - Smiling Tiger (Russell Baze; 57.78)
 2008 - Maidens Justice (Juan Ochoa; 58.71)
 2007 - Imaginary Sailor (Chad Schvaneveldt; 57.70)

References

External links
 Golden Gate Fields website

Ungraded stakes races in the United States
Horse races in California
Sports in the San Francisco Bay Area
Flat horse races for two-year-olds
Recurring sporting events established in 2007
Golden Gate Fields
2007 establishments in California